Kelso is an abandoned small settlement in Otago, New Zealand, located ten kilometres north of Tapanui on the Crookston Burn, close to its junction with the larger Pomahaka River. Its population during the 1960s and 1970s was close to 300, with most of its economy based on sheep farming. A small dairy factory was a focal point in the village's early years.

The township was first surveyed in 1875, and the first settlement began the following year. It was named by John Turnbull Thomson for the Scottish home town of one of the town's first settlers, James Logan. Originally intended as the main settlement in the West Otago area, this title eventually went to nearby Tapanui. The town was linked to Waipahi and the Main South Line railway on 1 December 1880 with the opening of the Tapanui Branch line.  On 1 April 1884, this line was extended from Kelso to Heriot.

The township was frequently subject to flooding, notably in 1913 and 1917. It was inundated with flood water during two major floods of the Clutha River catchment in 1978 and 1980.  The former led to the closure of the railway, and after the latter flood it was decided to relocate the settlement entirely.

Today, little remains to indicate the location of Kelso, other than a stone memorial and faded wording referring to the township on several remaining buildings.

A book of the history of Kelso was written by May Brownlie, called Kismet for Kelso (published 1992).

References

Conway, G. "In memory of a town that drowned." Otago Daily Times (Dunedin) 31 May 2008, p. 19.

Geography of Otago
Ghost towns in Otago
1876 establishments in New Zealand
1980 disestablishments in New Zealand
Populated places established in 1876
Populated places disestablished in 1980